First Intuition is a United Kingdom based provider of accountancy training. It was founded in 2007 and is a partnership run by the five founders. First Intuition works on the principle of smaller class sizes, capping all classes at 30, a unique feature not seen at any other accountancy training provider.

First Intuition's most notable achievement to date is becoming the youngest business ever to win the Accountancy College of the year award 4 times, in six year, 2010 awarded to London, 2012 awarded to Cambridge, 2014 awarded to Bristol and 2016 awarded to London.

Since the opening of London in 2007, First Intuition has expanded to 6 regional training centres nationally in London, Cambridge, Reading, Bristol, Maidstone and Manchester. As well as this First Intuition has now opened internationally in Spain, Azerbaijan, China and Pakistan.

History
First Intuition was founded in June 2007 when the 5 founding partners realised they shared the ambition to provide 'a fresh approach to accountancy training'. All 5 founders are qualified Chartered Accountants with over 60 years teaching experience between them, experience they say they hope to use when establishing an accountancy training provider.

Regional training centres

Bristol 
Bristol was opened in February 2011 by Simon Emery, Graham Harbord, Andy Rogers and Jim O'Brien. At the Bristol centre, a full suite of courses is offered for all of the leading professional qualifications; ICAEW(Institute of Chartered Accountants in England & Wales), ACCA (Association of Chartered Certified Accountants) and CIMA (Chartered Institute of Management Accountants).

Cambridge
Cambridge was opened in June 2009 by Gareth John and Stuart Brown, with their long-time colleague Helen Lovett. At the Cambridge centre, a full suite of courses is offered for all of the leading professional qualifications; AAT (Association of Accounting Technicians), ICAEW(Institute of Chartered Accountants in England & Wales), ACCA (Association of Chartered Certified Accountants) and CIMA (Chartered Institute of Management Accountants). In 2011 Gareth John received the tutor of the year award. In 2012 Cambridge received the accountancy college of the year award.

Chelmsford 
Chelmsford was opened in 2011 by David Malthouse, Kelley O’Donovan, Gareth John and Stuart Brown. At the Chelmsford centre, a full suite of courses is offered for all of the leading professional qualifications; AAT (Association of Accounting Technicians), ICAEW(Institute of Chartered Accountants in England & Wales), ACCA (Association of Chartered Certified Accountants) and CIMA (Chartered Institute of Management Accountants).

In 2021, Chelmsford was awarded an Outstanding grade by Ofsted.

Ipswich 
Ipswich run AAT (Association of Accounting Technicians) and ICAEW(Institute of Chartered Accountants in England & Wales), courses.

London 
London was opened in June 2007 by the 5 founding partners; Nick Brice, Sarah Habgood, Paul Moore, Tim Paton, Mike Pennington.

At the London centre, a full suite of courses is offered for all of the leading professional qualifications; ICAEW(Institute of Chartered Accountants in England & Wales), ACCA (Association of Chartered Certified Accountants) and CIMA (Chartered Institute of Management Accountants). In 2010 London received the accountancy college of the year award.

Maidstone
Maidstone was opened in February 2011 by Ian Fidock. At the Maidstone centre, courses are offered in the following leading professional qualifications; ICAEW(Institute of Chartered Accountants in England & Wales) and ACCA (Association of Chartered Certified Accountants).

Manchester
First Intuition Manchester was opened in October 2012 by Andy Booth, Darren Hodgson and Louise Setton. Formerly known as 'iCount Training Partnership' the business was established in January 2010, and merged with First Intuition Limited on 1 December 2021.

At the Manchester centre, a full suite of courses is offered for all of the leading professional qualifications; ICAEW (Institute of Chartered Accountants in England & Wales), ACCA (Association of Chartered Certified Accountants) and CIMA (Chartered Institute of Management Accountants).

Norwich 
Norwich was opened in 2019 by Gareth John and Stuart Brown. At the Norwich centre, a full suite of courses is offered for all of the leading professional qualifications; AAT (Association of Accounting Technicians), ICAEW(Institute of Chartered Accountants in England & Wales), ACCA (Association of Chartered Certified Accountants)

Peterborough 
Peterborough run AAT (Association of Accounting Technicians) and ACCA (Association of Chartered Certified Accountants) courses.

Reading
Reading was opened in January 2011 by Jo Dyson, Matt Dyson, Ryan Hill and Claire Needham, Rob Stephens. At the Reading centre, a full suite of courses is offered for all of the leading professional qualifications; ICAEW(Institute of Chartered Accountants in England & Wales), ACCA (Association of Chartered Certified Accountants) and CIMA (Chartered Institute of Management Accountants).

AAT Distance Learning 
Our AAT Distance Learning Team is headed up by Nick Craggs who won ‘AAT Tutor of the Year 2020’, and his distance learning team have won ‘AAT Distance Learning Provider of the Year’ at the AAT Awards 2020. We’re also pleased to have been awarded PQ Magazine Online College of the Year 2020. Our AAT Distance Learning team won AAT Large Training Provider of the Year 2018, achieving the highest score (based on completion rates, progression and pass rates) out of all 100 applications! Plus Best use of E-Learning at the 2017 AAT Awards.

References

British companies established in 2007
Companies based in the London Borough of Camden
2007 in London
2007 establishments in England